Hemichrysops is a genus of horse flies in the family Tabanidae.

Species
Hemichrysops fascipennis Kröber, 1930

References

Tabanidae
Tabanoidea genera
Diptera of South America
Taxa named by Otto Kröber